Haggard may refer to an adjective reflecting exhaustion or poverty.
Haggard may also refer to:

Arts, entertainment, and media
 Haggard (band), a German symphonic metal group
 Haggard (TV series), a British comedy television series
 Haggard: The Movie, a 2003 film by Bam Margera
 King Haggard, a fictional character in Peter S. Beagle's The Last Unicorn

Other
 Haggard (surname)
 Haggard family, a British family
 Haggard, Kansas, a community in the United States
 USS Haggard (DD-555) (1943–1945), destroyer

See also

 
 Hoggard (disambiguation)
 Haggar (disambiguation)